Garrus (also Romanized as Garrūs and Garroos; also known as Gīrow, Gīrū, Karnow, Keruo, and Kerus) is a village in Chelleh Khaneh Rural District of Sufian District, Shabestar County, East Azerbaijan province, Iran. At the 2006 National Census, its population was 1,737 in 481 households. The following census in 2011 counted 1,903 people in 538 households. The latest census in 2016 showed a population of 2,002 people in 582 households; it was the largest village in its rural district.

References 

Shabestar County

Populated places in East Azerbaijan Province

Populated places in Shabestar County